Mohamed Nassoh (born 26 January 2003) is a Dutch footballer who plays for Jong PSV as a midfielder.

Career
An academy graduate of PSV, Nassoh signed his first professional contract in July 2020. Nassoh made his professional debut on 19 April 2021 for Jong PSV in the Eerste Divisie at home against De Graafschap. Coming on as a late substitute for Emmanuel Matuta, Jong PSV lost the match 2–0.

On 17 November 2021, Nassoh signed a contract extension keeping him at PSV until 2024.

References

2003 births
Living people
Dutch footballers
Jong PSV players
Eerste Divisie players
Association football midfielders
Dutch sportspeople of Moroccan descent